Stemonurus apicalis is a species of plant in the Stemonuraceae family. It is endemic to Sri Lanka.

References

Flora of Sri Lanka
Stemonuraceae
Critically endangered plants
Taxonomy articles created by Polbot